Chartronges is a commune in the Seine-et-Marne department in the Île-de-France region in north-central France.

History

In the 12th century, under the name of Chaterongue, the town's church, dedicated to Saint-Pierre-aux-Liens, depended on several others at the abbey of Solesmes from the 11th century. There was a statue of Saint Barbara in polychrome wood. In 1789, Chartronges was part of the election of Coulommiers and the generality of Paris. Meaux Customs governed it.

Demographics
The inhabitants are called Chartrongeais. Its demographics have been documented via the population censuses performed by the municipality since 1793. By 2006, the population numbers of municipalities were published annually by Insee. In the previous census of 2018, the town had 295 inhabitants.

Climate

The town benefits from the mild subtropical climate of the central and northern regions, as the number of large ponds in France suggests. This type of climate affects the whole Paris Basin, and it expands southwest, impacting, for example, every single municipality of Seine-et-Marne.

The climate variables that made it feasible to determine the traits of the region are mainly the temperatures and precipitation, the monthly statistics of which correspond to the 1971–2000 standard. The mentioned variables characterizing the municipality will be discussed again in the sections below. Due to weather modification, these factors have evolved. This growth has been reported by the historic Météo-France meteorological channel, as in Melun - Villaroche, which is 46 kilometres as the crow flies and where the typical yearly temperature of 11.2 °C during 1981–2010 had changed to 11.6 °C during 1991–2020.

Natura 2000 community
Natura 2000 is a network of nature protection areas in the territory of the European Union. It comprises Special Areas of Conservation and Special Protection Areas designated under the Habitats Directive and the Birds Directive, respectively. Member states are supposed to maintain and protect designated areas within their jurisdiction. The municipality underneath the Habitats Directive set up a Natura 2000 web page. There is a Natura 2000 site in the town under the Habitats Directive, the river Vannetin, with an area of 63 acres (156 acres).

Typology

According to the National Institute of Statistics and Economic Studies, Chartronges is a rural municipality due to its low population density. It is a part of the Paris metropolitan area.

Localities and quarters
Chartronges has 54 localities.

Land usage

According to a survey done in 2018, The breakdown of land usage in Chartronges is as follows: arable land (93% ), artificial green spaces, non-agricultural (3.5% ), urbanized areas (3% ), heterogeneous agricultural areas (0.4%)

Planning
In 2019, the municipality had a local urban plan under review.

Accommodation

In 2017, the municipality had 114 dwellings, 100 per cent of them private places such as townhouses, farmhouses, or pavilions. Of those dwellings, 91.2 per cent were primary residences, 6.1 per cent were second homes, and 2.6 per cent were empty dwellings.

See also
 Communes of the Seine-et-Marne department

References

External links

 1999 Land Use, from IAURIF (Institute for Urban Planning and Development of the Paris-Île-de-France région) 

Communes of Seine-et-Marne